Bothrops sanctaecrucis, or the Bolivian lancehead, is a species of venomous snake in the  family Viperidae. It is endemic to South America.

Geographic range
It is found in Bolivia in the departments of Beni and Santa Cruz.

The type locality is Río Sécure, Oromono, Bolivia.

References

Further reading
 Hoge, A.R. 1966. Preliminary account on Neotropical Crotalinae (Serpentes: Viperidae). Memórias do Instituto Butantan 32 [1965]: 109–184.

sanctaecrucis
Reptiles of Bolivia
Endemic fauna of Bolivia
Reptiles described in 1966